Roman Yurievich Zakharyin (also known as Zakharyin-Yuriev and Zakharyin-Koshkin; c. 1500 – 16 February 1543) was a Russian okolnichy and voivode who is best known as progenitor of the Romanov dynasty, which was named after him. He was the father of boyar Nikita Romanovich and Tsaritsa Anastasia Romanovna, and grandfather of Patriarch Filaret and Feodor I of Russia. His father was Yuri Zakharyevich Koshkin, the son of Zakhary Ivanovich Koshkin, a descendant of Andrei Kobyla.

There is very little available information about him; it is known that he was a voivode in the 1530s, his wife was named Uliana and he died on 16 February 1543. It was later found that he was between 178 and 183 cm (approximately six feet) tall and suffered from Paget's disease, which, according to historian Alexander Shirokorad, may have caused him to leave service as voivode in 1535.

Sources
Alexander Shirokorad: Путь к трону (AST, 2004). , .
ThePeerage.com: Roman Yurievich Zahar'in

House of Romanov
1500s births
1543 deaths
Date of birth unknown

Year of birth uncertain
16th-century Russian people